Banu Cennetoğlu (b. Ankara, 1970) is a visual artist based in Istanbul. She uses photography, installation, and printed matter to explore the classification, appropriation and distribution of data and knowledge. Her work deals with listings, collections, rearrangements, and archives. Cennetoğlu co-represented Turkey at the 53rd International Venice Biennale with Ahmet Öğüt in 2009. Her work has been shown at numerous international institutions such as Musée cantonal des Beaux-arts, Lausanne (2022); Kunsthalle Wien, Vienna (2020); Ständehaus, Kunstsammlung Nordrhein-Westfallen, Düsseldorf (2019); SculptureCenter, New York (2019); Liverpool Biennial, Liverpool (2018), Chisenhale Gallery, London (2018); documenta14, Athens and Kassel (2017); Bonner Kunstverein, Bonn (2015); Kunsthalle Basel, Basel (2011); Gwangju Biennale, Gwangju (2014), Manifesta 8, Murcia (2010); Walker Art Center (2007); Istanbul Biennial (2007); and Berlin Biennial (2003). She is the founding director of BAS (2006–ongoing), an Istanbul-based artist-run initiative that collects and displays artists’ books and printed material as artwork. In Turkey, she is "best known as an apostle of the artist’s book."

Education 
Cennetoğlu received a BA in psychology and then studied photography in Paris. From 1996 to 2002, she lived in New York where she worked on documentary and fashion photography for publications such as Purple and Self Service. In 2002, she moved to Amsterdam where she studied a.o. at the Rijksakademie van beeldende kunsten and got involved with artists' books. In 2005, she moved back to Turkey. In 2016, she was a guest at the DAAD Artists-in-Berlin Program.

Selected works

The List, 2007–ongoing 
Since 2007, Cennetoğlu has been developing The List in collaboration with UNITED for Intercultural Action, an Amsterdam-based network in support of migrants and refugees. The work is a collection of data about thousands of immigrants, asylum seekers, and refugees who died on their way to or at the border of the European Union since 1993. It is presented in multiple forms, including posters, billboards, newspaper supplements, and public screens, in various cities, including Amsterdam, Athens, Basel, Istanbul, Sofia, Bonn, Milano, Los Angeles, Berlin, London, and Liverpool.The List featured data about 7,128 individuals when first exhibited in Amsterdam in 2007. As of May 2018, it includes 34,361 cases. Cennetoğlu does not consider the project "an art piece"; she does not edition it, sell it or sign it. Although she doesn't consider this project an artwork, she acknowledges a connection between The List and her artistic practice, as her artworks deal with witness-bearing. This work exemplifies how Cennetoğlu assumes different positions such as caretaker and a facilitator—not only an author—when she deals with lists and archives.  "Governments don’t keep these record for the public; they don’t want the public to see these records because it exposes their policies, so you have NGOs trying to put data together, and that data is incomplete and fragile, but there again someone has to do it. And I want to contribute to that with what I have and what I do—but not by aestheticizing it. You cannot represent this kind of darkness through art."   The 2017 edition was distributed as an insert in Tagesspiegel Berlin edition. The 2018 edition was printed and distributed as a supplement by The Guardian in a print run of 210,000 on World Refugee Day, June 20, 2018. Subsequently, it was exhibited in the form of posters at Great George Street in Liverpool as part of the Liverpool Biennial 2018 and in conjunction with Cennetoğlu’s solo exhibition at Chisenhale Gallery, London. On August 1, 2018, the posters in Liverpool were anonymously destroyed and removed. Some suggested that a council worker may have mistaken the work as an illegal poster and taken it down, but a spokesperson from the city council refused the allegation. The work was reinstalled on August 5, 2018, but was vandalised again shortly afterwards.

Catalog 2009, 2009 
As part of Lapses, the two-artist exhibition (with Ahmet Öğüt) curated by Başak Şenova for the Pavilion of Turkey at the 53rd International Venice Biennale, Cennetoğlu produced CATALOG 2009 (2009), a book that mimics the format of a mail-order catalog, comprising 450 photographs organized in fifteen categories inspired by stock photography: composition, color, assumption, negotiation, operation, vanity, adjustment, excursion, caution, love, seizure, exploit, act, invasion and replacement. Cennetoğlu created subjective categories to organize her photographs along with a few found photographs, challenging the assumed hierarchies of value. For the duration of the exhibition in Venice, the viewers were encouraged to order and download the featured photographs from the Internet free or charge.

04.09.2014, 2014 
In the early 2010s, Cennetoğlu started creating bound collections of daily newspapers printed in one day and has produced different editions of this work in several countries, including Turkey, Switzerland, and Germany. The work offers a juxtaposition of information in an unconventional way, and questions the politics of representation through print media. The artist calls it a "re-contextualization" of the newspaper and "an almost monumentalization" as the archiving of printed matter is meant to be temporary.

Gurbet's Diary, 2017 
Commissioned by documenta14, Gurbet's Diary is a work that comprises 82,661 words in mirror image placed on 145 press-ready lithographic limestone slabs. It draws from Gurbet's Diary. I Engraved My Heart into the Mountains by Gurbetelli Ersöz, first published in 1998 by Mezopotamien Verlag, Neuss. Ersöz was a chemist turned editor turned guerrilla—a Kurdish fighter who kept a journal as an act of resistance between 1995 and 1997. In her diary, she writes about her experience as a fighter as well as her observations in nature, poetry she likes, and the difference between being an intellectual and a fighter. She was killed in 1997. As part of the exhibition in Kassel, Cennetoğlu also created a related work, replacing the usual inscription of "Museum Fridericianum" with "Being safe is scary"—as a tribute to Ersöz.

1 January 1970 – 21 March 2018 · H O W B E I T · Guilty feet have got no rhythm · Keçiboynuzu · AS IS · MurMur · I measure every grief I meet · Taq u Raq · A piercing Comfort it affords · Stitch · Made in Fall · Yes. But. We had a golden heart. · One day soon I’m gonna tell the moon about the crying game, 2018 
Cennetoğlu's most recent work is a 128 hours and 22 minutes long film work that comprises an unedited archive of all the digital images the artist has amassed between June 2006 and March 2018. The film features all the photographs and videos the artist took, the images she received on his phone and email, all of her video works, their documentation, exhibitions, as well as images from her private life. Considered as an act of "vulnerability and rebelliousness", the work is an investigation of collective histories through the images the artist has collected over 12 years. The title was inspired by Clarice Lispector's The Hour of the Star, a novel with thirteen subtitles separated by or's.

Exhibitions 
Selected group exhibitions include Musée cantonal des Beaux-arts, Lausanne (2022); Kunsthalle Wien, Vienna (2020); Ständehaus, Kunstsammlung Nordrhein-Westfallen, Düsseldorf (2019); Liverpool Biennial, Liverpool (2018); Stories of Almost Everyone, Hammer Museum, Los Angeles (2018); 3rd Berlin Herbstsalon, Maxim Gorki Theater, Berlin (2017); documenta14, Athens and Kassel (2017); It is Obvious from the Map, Redcat, Los Angeles (2017); The Restless Earth, Fondazione Nicola Trussardi, Milan (2017); … und eine Welt noch, Kunsthaus Hamburg, Hamburg (2016); Burning Down The House, 10th Gwangju Bienniale, Gwangju (2014); Frozen Lakes, Artist’s Space, New York (2013); Manifesta 8, Murcia (2010); The Pavilion of Turkey at the 53rd Venice Biennale (2009); 3rd Berlin Biennale (2008); 1st Athens Biennale (2007); and 10th Istanbul Biennale (2007).

The artist is represented by Rodeo Gallery, based in London and Piraeus.

Artist-run initiative 
In 2006, Cennetoğlu initiated an artist-run project called BAS, which roughly translates as "print". The space currently hosts a collection of artists' books and ephemera on permanent display, which has grown from her own collection. The collection comprises three main categories: artists' publications, periodicals, and project publications with an online inventory. The artists' books in the collection are produced in large editions and circulate outside of mainstream art channels. This can be considered as an extension of her artistic research on the collection, organization, and dissemination of information.

Alongside BAS, Cennetoğlu collaborated with artist Philippine Hoegen to establish Bent, the publishing project that focused on commissioning artists' books by artists from Turkey. The first publication was Pavement Myth-The Life of the Pavement’s Wolf (1, 2, 3, 4, 5, 6) by Masist Gül, followed by artists' books Takip/Poursuite (2006) by Aslı Çavuşoğlu, Bent003 by Emre Hüner, Sahil Sahnesi Sesi (2008) Cevdet Erek, KILAVUZ (2009) by the artist collective Atılkunst, among others.

BAS also hosted exhibitions, including Masist Gül (2011); Artists' books from Georgia and BAS Collection (2011); KORIDOR 1988–1995 (2010); Artists' books by Sol LeWitt (2009), and more.

To develop the BAS Collection, Cennetoğlu prioritizes diversity over personal taste as she has an open acquisition policy when buying, accepting, and bartering artists' books. The collection is open to the public.

In 2014, collectorspace, an Istanbul-based nonprofit, collaborated with Cennetoğlu and the BAS Collection to work on an exhibition with a newspaper project borrowed from the collection, titled Corrections and Clarifications (2001–ongoing) by artist Anita Di Bianco.

References 

1970 births
Living people
20th-century Turkish women artists
21st-century Turkish women artists
People from Ankara
Women video artists
Turkish contemporary artists